Mozaffarabad (also Romanized as Moz̧affarābād) is a village in Lishtar Rural District, in the Central District of Gachsaran County, Kohgiluyeh and Boyer-Ahmad Province, Iran. At the 2006 census, its population was 559, in 114 families.

References 

Populated places in Gachsaran County